The Alameda Theatre is an Art Deco movie theatre built in 1932 in Alameda, California. It opened with a seating capacity of 2,168. It was designed by architect Timothy L. Pflueger and was the last grand movie palace built in the San Francisco Bay Area. It closed in the 1980s as a triplex theatre and was later used as a gymnastics studio. A restoration and expansion project was completed in 2008, making the historic theater the primary anchor of an eight-screen multiplex.

See also
 Paramount Theatre (Oakland, California)
 Fox Oakland Theatre
 Grand Lake Theater

References

External links

 Alameda Theatre & Cineplex's official website and movie showtimes

Cinemas and movie theaters in the San Francisco Bay Area
Movie palaces
Buildings and structures completed in 1932
Art Deco architecture in California
Culture in the San Francisco Bay Area